Henna Singal (born 12 December 1984) is an Indian singer and started her singing career in 2014. Her song "Crazy Baalam" (Fame) was released in December 2014, which was with music director Vivek Kar and the lyrics were written by the Bollywood lyricist Kumaar with the label of ZEE music. She released her first song "Jazbaat" in May 2014 with Tejwant Kittu with the label of Goyal music and the lyrics were written by Amber Maan.

Biography 
She is the daughter of the business man Deepak Singal and his wife Sunita. She completed her Engineering in Electronics and Communication from Thapar University while she did her master's degree in international business from London. She is a director at her father's company Deepak Builders Pvt Ltd. and general secretary of Thapar University Alumni Association, Patiala.

Singal started her singing career in 2014. She released her first song "Jazbaat" in May 2014 with Tejwant Kittu with the label of Goyal music and the lyrics were written by Amber Maan. Her second song "Crazy Baalam" was released again in December 2014, which was with music director Vivek Kar and the lyrics were written by Kumaar with the label of ZEE music, her third song "Heer" released in July 2015 by Creator Audio Video and it is composed by Dr Shree and the lyrics by Mr. Kumaar. Her fourth song “Mahiya” released in November 2015 by her own home production "Henna DS Productions". Her debut album Crazy Baalam was released in December 2015.

References

Indian women playback singers
1984 births
Living people
Musicians from Ludhiana
Singers from Punjab, India
Women musicians from Punjab, India
21st-century Indian women singers
21st-century Indian singers